Labdia cyanocoma is a moth in the family Cosmopterigidae. It is found in Peru.

References

Further reading
 
Natural History Museum Lepidoptera generic names catalog

Labdia
Moths described in 1922